Mailey is a surname. Notable people with the surname include:

Arthur Mailey (1886–1967), Australian cricketer
Laci J. Mailey (born 1990), Canadian actress
Willie Mailey (1943–1992), Scottish footballer

See also
Maile (disambiguation)